"Estigma De Amor" is Latin Pop song written and performed by Kany García and fifth single of her debut album Cualquier Día.

Track listing 
"Estigma De Amor": 3:55 (Album Version)

Music video 
The story of this music video is the beach scene of Guerrero in Mexico at different times of day, where the passing of the hours are combined with lyrics of this beautiful song, which emanate directly from the mind and heart of this wonderful singer. The music video for "Estigma De Amor" was shot at the beginning of October. The video was directed by Beto Hinojosa & Pablo Dávila.

Chart performances 
"Estigma De Amor" became Kany's fifth single from her debut album "Cualquier Dia". The song was only released to Puerto Rico and United States radio. The song debuted on Billboard Latin Pop Airplay at #38 and quickly starting charting higher where it reached #15. It became Kany third Top 20 hit on that chart. It also charted on Billboard Top Latin Songs at #43 becoming Kany's fourth Top 50 hit. It charted well on Kany homeland Puerto Rico, on where it hit #1 on their Top 50 songs with only 4 weeks on the chart. It did well on Puerto Rico's download charts, on where it landed at #3.

Charts

Other Versions
In 2012 a new version was included in Kany's self-titled album "Kany García", a duet with Antonia Carmona.
A duet version was included in Kany's 2014 live album [[En Vivo (Kany Garcia album)|En Vivo: Kany Garcia]]'' which was recorded with her mother Shela De Jesus.

Release history

References

2008 singles
Kany García songs
Songs written by Kany García
2006 songs
Sony BMG Norte singles